Kurów-Wieś is a village in the administrative district of Gmina Oporów, within Kutno County, Łódź Voivodeship, in central Poland.

References 

Villages in Kutno County